Kalia Van Osch (born October 8, 1993 in Nanaimo, British Columbia) is a Canadian curler from Parksville, British Columbia. She skipped for British Columbia at the 2014 Canadian Junior Curling Championships to place second.

Van Osch also represented British Columbia playing third for her sister Kesa Van Osch at the 2012 Canadian Junior Curling Championships where she led her team to a third-place finish.

References

External links 
 

Canadian women curlers
1993 births
Curlers from British Columbia
Living people
Sportspeople from Nanaimo
People from Parksville, British Columbia